Louisiana Purchase is a 1941 American musical comedy film directed by Irving Cummings and starring Bob Hope, Vera Zorina, and Victor Moore. It is an adaptation of Irving Berlin's 1940 Broadway musical of the same name. A Paramount Pictures production, the film was directed by Irving Cummings, with Robert Emmett Dolan serving as musical director as he had done for the play. The film satirises the US Democratic Party and political corruption. The film was Bob Hope's first feature film in Technicolor. The title refers to the State of Louisiana offering to drop the deceased leader Huey Long's controversial Share Our Wealth program, and fully support President Franklin Roosevelt and his New Deal. In return, FDR promised federal dollars for public works in Louisiana, a deal cynically referred to by many as the second Louisiana Purchase.

Starring Paramount's house comedian Bob Hope in the role William Gaxton played on stage, the film featured Vera Zorina, Victor Moore and Irène Bordoni reprising their stage roles. Raoul Pene Du Bois did the production and costume design and was nominated for the Academy Award for Best Art Direction-Interior Decoration, Color along with Stephen Seymour. The cinematography was by Harry Hallenberger and Ray Rennahan who also received a nomination for the Academy Award for Best Cinematography.

Plot
The film begins with a Hollywood legal adviser giving dictation to his secretary that the stage show property Louisiana Purchase is unfilmable, unless strong disclaimers are made that it is a total work of fiction. The next scene features a musical number declaring that information.

Louisiana State Representative Jim Taylor is told by his fellow partners of the Louisiana Purchase Company who have engaged in misusing Federal government funds for their own avarice that a Republican Federal Senator Oliver P. Loganberry is arriving in the State during Mardi Gras in New Orleans. The Senator will conduct hearings to establish evidence of their corrupt conduct with Taylor's cronies deciding Taylor he will be the fall guy. Taylor has one chance to avoid imprisonment; lure the Republican Senator into a honey trap. Searching for a woman, Taylor's friend Madame Yvonne Bordelaise recommends the visiting European woman  Marina Von Minden who is desperately seeking money to obtain a visa for her mother to leave Europe.

Marina initially goes along with the scheme and poses for incriminating photo when the Senator is tricked into getting drunk. She has a change of heart and decides to explain the photographs by saying the Senator Loganberry has proposed to her. Taylor has fallen in love with Marina and avoids the Senator making his charges in the Legislature by doing a filibuster for three days, with Taylor explaining that he has the express permission of James Stewart.

Cast

Bob Hope as Jim Taylor
Vera Zorina as Marina Von Minden
Victor Moore as Sen. Oliver P. Loganberry
Irène Bordoni as Madame Yvonne Bordelaise
Phyllis Ruth as Emmy Lou
Dona Drake as Beatrice
Raymond Walburn as Colonel Davis
Maxie Rosenbloom as The Shadow aka Wilson
 Donald MacBride as Captain Pierre Whitfield
 Andrew Tombes as Dean Albert Manning
 Robert Warwick as Speaker of the House
 Charles La Torre as Gaston, Waiter
 Charles Laskey as Danseur
 Emory Parnell as Sam Horowitz, Lawyer
 Iris Meredith as Lawyer's secretary
 Catherine Craig as Saleslady
 Jack Norton as Jester
 Sam McDaniel as Sam
 Frances Gifford as Salesgirl
 Brooks Benedict as Senator 
 Kay Aldridge as Louisiana Belle
 Karin Booth as Louisiana Belle 
 Rebel Randall as Louisiana Belle 
 Barbara Britton as Louisiana Belle
 Brooke Evans as Louisiana Belle
 Blanche Grady as Louisiana Belle
 Lynda Grey as Louisiana Belle
 Margaret Hayes as Louisiana Belle
 Louise LaPlanche as Louisiana Belle
 Barbara Slater as Louisiana Belle
 Eleanor Stewart as Louisiana Belle
 Jean Wallace as Louisiana Belle

References

External links

1941 films
Films based on musicals
Film
Films directed by Irving Cummings
1940s musical comedy-drama films
American musical comedy-drama films
1940s political comedy-drama films
American political comedy-drama films
Films about politicians
Paramount Pictures films
1940s American films